Heydar Aliyev, the former President of Azerbaijan, died on 12 December 2003 in the Cleveland Clinic (United States) at 10 am local time from heart failure at the age of 80. On 14 December, his coffin was taken to Baku.

Funeral commission 
On 13 December, Azerbaijani President Ilham Aliyev signed a decree on the establishment of the State Commission for the funeral of his father, Heydar. The following list contains members of the commission:

 Ilham Aliyev - President of the Republic and Chairman of the State Commission
 Murtuz Alasgarov - Speaker of the National Assembly of Azerbaijan
 Artur Rasizade - Prime Minister of Azerbaijan
 Ramiz Mehdiyev - Head of the Presidential Administration
 Farhad Abdullayev - Chairman of the Constitutional Court 
 Vilayat Guliyev - Minister of Foreign Affairs 
 Safar Abiyev - Minister of Defense
 Namig Abbasov - Minister of National Security 
 Ramil Usubov - Minister of Internal Affairs
 Zakir Garalov - Prosecutor General
 Allahshukur Pashazade - Chairman of the Caucasian Muslims Office
 Mahmud Karimov - President of the National Academy of Sciences of Azerbaijan
 Hajibala Abutalibov - Mayor of Baku
 Anar Rzayev - Chairman of the Writers' Union of Azerbaijan

Ceremony 
The farewell ceremony was held 15 December 2003 at the Palace of the Republic (nowadays Heydar Aliyev Palace) and was broadcast live on the main Azerbaijani TV channels. The funeral lasted seven hours and was attended by 250,000 people. At 9.00 local time, the farewell ceremony began, with a guard of honor from the National Guard of Azerbaijan being lined up at the coffin. A prayer service was also held at the local mosque. After the official ceremony, a procession of many kilometres took place. After staying in Baku for only an hour and a half, Putin and Nazarbayev left the ceremonies early via Bina International Airport. Heydar Aliyev was buried in the Alley of Honor next to his wife Zarifa Aliyeva. During the funeral, an artillery salute was given.

Dignitaries 
The ceremony was attended by past and present Azerbaijani politicians and a plethora of international dignitaries, which included the following:
 The President of Azerbaijan, Ilham Aliyev
 The First Lady of Azerbaijan, Mehriban Aliyeva
 The President of Russia, Vladimir Putin
 The Mayor of Moscow, Yury Luzhkov
 The President of Dagestan, Magomedali Magomedov
 The Secretary General of CIS, Vladimir Rushallo
 The President of Kazakhstan, Nursultan Nazarbayev
 The President of Kyrgyzstan, Askar Akayev
 The President of Moldova, Vladimir Voronin
 The President of Georgia, Nino Burjanadze
 The Former President of Georgia, Eduard Shevardnadze
 Candidate in the 2004 Georgian presidential election, Mikheil Saakashvili
 Chairman of the Government of Adjara, Aslan Abashidze
 The President of Ukraine, Leonid Kuchma
 The President of Turkey, Ahmet Necdet Sezer
 The Prime Minister of Turkey, Recep Tayyip Erdoğan
 The Speaker of the Legislative Chamber of the Oliy Majlis, Erkin Khalilov

Reactions 
  President of Kazakhstan Nursultan Nazarbayev expressed condolences to Ilham Aliyev, saying "The people of Azerbaijan suffered a heavy loss".
  On 13 December, President of Kyrgyzstan Askar Akayev sent a telegram of condolences to Ilham Aliyev.
  Russian President Vladimir Putin expressed his condolences in a phone call with President Ilham Aliyev. The Azerbaijani Embassy in Moscow opened its doors for people to sign the book of condolences. Patriarch Alexy II of Moscow referred to Aliyev as "the wisest statesman has passed away, who devoted his whole life to the prosperity of the people of Azerbaijan and made a significant contribution to strengthening the once common state for our peoples." Condolences also came from former Russian Premier Yevgeny Primakov.
  The United States Department of State sent condolences to Ilham Aliyev.

Gallery

References

External links 

 The return of Aliyev's body to Baku

2003 in Azerbaijan
Aliyev, Heydar
Heydar Aliyev
Aliyev, Heydar
Aliyev, Heydar
December 2003 events in Asia